In firearms, barrel threads refer to the screw threads used to attach a barrel.

Action threads, also called receiver threads, are situated at the chamber end of the barrel, and can be used for attaching the barrel to the receiver. The receiver normally has corresponding threads which are internal, with the matching action threads on the barrel usually being external threads. This design is most commonly used in rifles and revolvers, but also on some pistols and shotguns. This method of fixing a barrel to a receiver has been used extensively by firearms manufacturers since before the 20th century, and can be viewed as a traditional barrel mounting method. Action threads are not the only method of fixing a barrel to a receiver (see Alternative methods below). Furthermore, recoil-operated firearm designs have moving barrels (e.g. most  pistols or the Barrett M82 rifle).

Muzzle threads are situated at the muzzle end of the barrel and can be used for mounting accessories such as a flash hider, suppressor or muzzle brake (compensator).

Designation 
There are many systems for designating thread types (metric, unified, Whitworth, etc.). Threading can be specified by diameter, pitch, angle, length and fit tolerances. However, the use of action threads is not well standardized within the firearms industry, and threading can vary between manufacturers and models.

For example, factory and aftermarket receivers using the Remington 700 footprint are produced with various types of action threads, all with a  diameter, but with a pitch of either a 1.588 mm (16 TPI, Remington standard), 1.411 mm (18 TPI) or 1.270 mm (20 TPI, Savage standard).

Many older rifles from the first half of the 20th century use a thread pitch around 2 mm (12.7 TPI), while many modern rifle use thread pitches around 1.5 mm (16.93 TPI). Fine threaded systems intended for hand tightening typically use thread pitches around 1 mm (25.4 TPI).

Mounting 
Using action threads to mount a barrel to a receiver typically requires fitting by a competent gunsmith, and typically some machining has to be done. 

In this process it is important so set the correct headspace. Correct mounting is important both for safety and accuracy. If the barrel, receiver and bolt are not fitted properly, severe and potential fatal problems can arise due to faulty headspace, e.g. cartridge overpressure and case rupture. Threaded barrels are often mounted to the receiver with a lot of torque, and will therefore generally require tools for assembly and disassembly, such as a suitable action wrench and a vise. Depending on the firearm, a recoil lug is sometimes fitted between the barrel and stock as part of the process, 

Cleaning up the receiver and barrel action threads is often done during "blueprinting" in order to increase accuracy.

Action threads

List of action threads 
 M designates common V threads (like for instance metric threads)
 Sq designates square threads
 Tr designates trapezoidal threads
 The shank length is not always the same at the thread length, which is the case if the insert has a threadless portion (sub-shank)
 Tenon designates the thread length
 Shoulder designates the barrel diameter in front of the thread portion
 Unless otherwise mentioned, right hand threads are assumed. Left hand threads are designated "LH".

Alternative methods 
Several alternative mounting methods to using action threads exist.

Barrel press fit Pressing the barrel into the receiver to achieve a press fit is an alternative to using action threads which has been used on firearms such as Anschütz Fortner, Anschütz Model 54, AKM and Sauer 101.

Barrel nut Attaching the barrel to the receiver using a barrel nut and a barrel with a shoulder is an alternative to action threads, which has been used in firearms such as the Sten gun and AR-15.

Hand tools Quick barrel change systems is an increasingly popular alternative, as seen in for example SIG Sauer 200 STR, Roessler Titan or Blaser R8. These methods typically only require simple hand tools (like a hex key) or no tools at all. This can be an great advantage to competition shooters who regularly wear out barrels, or for hunters who want a modular rifle that can shoot several calibers. In these designs, the bolt locks directly into the barrel, and the manufacturer often guarantees that the barrel is headspaced correctly from the factory.

Muzzle threads 

Muzzle threads is one method of fitting accessories such as flash hiders, suppressors or muzzle brakes (compensators). The applicable thread is limited to a certain degree by the bullet caliber and barrel diameter. Right-hand threads (RH) are most common, but left-hand threads (LH) are sometimes used instead. Unless otherwise stated, right-hand threads are usually assumed. 

In Europe it has become common to use 1 mm muzzle thread pitches. M14x1 is a common thread type on European hunting barrels, while M18x1 is common on competition bull barrels. A larger barrel thread diameter can improve the precision of the barrel. As of 2021, various Unified threads are still the de facto standard on most American firearms, such as 1/2"-28 (M12.7x0.907) on 5.6 mm (.223") caliber rifles and 5/8"-24 (M15.88x1.058) on 7.62 mm (.308") calibers.

Some common barrel threads are listed below:

External threads on muzzle accessories 

Some accessories, notably suppressors and concussion reduction devices (CRDs), attach via a muzzle device such as a flash hider, compensator, thread protector or sleeve.

See also 
 Quick-change barrel system
 Press fit barrel
 Interrupted screw
 Trunnion

References

External links 
 Video of professional rifle barrel threading (YouTube)
 Video of chasing out receiver threads on a Mauser 98 (YouTube)

Firearm terminology